Shaw Organisation is a film distribution company and cinema chain founded by brothers Runme Shaw and Run Run Shaw who went to Singapore in the 1920s to expand their family business founded by Runje Shaw. The company originally operated as a distributor for the Shaw brothers' Tianyi Film Company (also called Unique) in Shanghai. Run Run Shaw later moved to Hong Kong in the 1950s to run Shaw Brothers Studio, whilst Runme Shaw stayed in Singapore to continue Shaw Organisation's operations. Unlike Tianyi, Shaw Organisation does not produce films but distribute them in their theatres.

History
Shaw Organisation has a long history in Singapore since its founding in 1924. They bought the land which the Shaw House now stands in the year 1952. The plot of land was originally granted to William Scott in 1845. About 500,000 square feet of land was levelled original Shaw House and the adjacent Lido Theatre.

The company managed single-screen cinemas until the late 1980s, when it decided to build cineplexes to give more flexibility in offering different types of films.  The first cineplexes built were the Prince and Jade cineplexes in Shaw Towers, opened in February 1988. Cineplexes have now become the standard for cinemas offering varied shows for smaller crowds.

The Shaw Organisation was founded in 1924 when Tan Runme Shaw (1901–1985) arrived in Singapore from Shanghai. He was the third of seven children of a Shanghai textile merchant, Shaw Yuh Hsuen (1867–1920).

In Shanghai, Runme's eldest brother Runje Shaw had founded the Tianyi Film Company (aka Unique). Not satisfied with the domestic market, the Shaw brothers sought business opportunities elsewhere, especially South-East Asia. Runme, as distribution manager was tasked to search for a suitable investment city. Runme's original destination was Indochina where he hoped to meet with the film distributors. However, he was denied permission to land there and instead, he ended up in Singapore, creating the Shaw Organisation. He was joined by his younger brother Sir Run Run Shaw two years later.

After the Great Depression, the Shaws decided to diversify their risk by branching out from their entertainment business into areas like amusement parks. They brought in ideas from abroad and modelled the parks after those in Shanghai, which proved to be popular amongst the local population.

From the mid 30s to the 80s, Shaw operated two popular fairgrounds – the Great World Amusement Park and the New World Amusement Park.

At its height, the company owned multiple cinemas and amusement parks throughout Singapore, Malaysia and Borneo, and spawned Shaw Brothers Studio in Hong Kong to feed its then-burgeoning operation.

By August 2000, a computerised ticketing system developed jointly with Singapore Computer Systems was launched. This system linked all Shaw theatres into a single network for automated telephone credit card purchases. With her extensive infrastructure, Shaw is now the biggest distributor of Asian cinema. Today, it manages and runs 70 screens in 7 locations in Singapore.

Business operations

Cinemas
Shaw Theatres has 8 cinemas and 78 screens in Singapore currently. Shaw Theatres Balestier is currently closed for renovations and will reopen in early 2023.

Current locations

Former locations

Commercial properties

Besides its involvement in film distribution, Shaw Organisation had investments in properties as well. The most prominent one is the Shaw House located at 350 Orchard Road with Isetan as its anchor tenant. The Shaw House is actually the organisation's largest project to date in Singapore. It took three years to construct and was finally completed in 1993.

Other than the Shaw House, the Shaw Organisation also owns other commercial properties including the Shaw Plaza, Shaw Centre, Shaw Corner, Oriental Plaza, Balestier Warehouse, North Bridge Road Shophouse and Mackenzie Road Shophouse.

Residential projects

Shaw Organisation also owns residential properties in Singapore. The two notable ones are Twin Heights and Hullet Rise. The others are single houses (With the exception of Jalan Sampurna which is a plot of land with two houses).

Subsidiaries

Shaw Organisation Pte Ltd owns the Shaw Properties Pte Ltd and Shaw Theatres Pte Ltd. Shaw Properties Pte Ltd oversees the operations in property development, acquisition and leasing whilst Shaw Theatres Pte Ltd oversees the operations in film purchase, distribution and the cinema's food and beverages.

Charity

Shaw Foundation
The Shaw Foundation was set up in 1957 by the Shaw brothers and is currently one of the largest philanthropic organisations in the world. Most of the money comes from its revenue from the properties under Shaw Properties Pte Ltd. All earnings from the Shaw Centre since the late 70s have been given to charitable organisations.

The largest amount that the Shaw Foundation has ever set aside was SGD 17.7 million in the year 1999. The largest share of the funding went to the National Kidney Foundation and most of its recipients were in the healthcare sector.

In the educational sector, the Shaw Foundation has been a regular donor to the National University of Singapore (NUS) since 1987, awarding around 240 scholarships to date.

Dr Shaw Vee Meng is currently the chairman of the Shaw Foundation. He is also the eldest son of Run Run Shaw.

National Kidney Foundation Singapore scandal 

The major recipient of Shaw Foundation's donations, the National Kidney Foundation (NKF) of Singapore was caught in a scandal mainly involving the misuse of donation funds of NKF. The incident circled around then chief executive officer, T.T Durai understating NKF's reserves and exaggerating the number of patients to encourage more donations, using the funds for personal reasons such as maintaining his personal car, travelling frequently on first class flights and an installation of a 'golden tap' in his private office suite. Durai dropped NKF's claims against the Singapore Press Holdings on 13 July 2005 after making several confessions during the trial and the entire board of NKF resigned on 14 July 2005.

Since the incident, there has been a said irreversible effect on trust issues for donations to charitable organisations in Singapore, including Shaw Foundation. For NKF itself, donations plummeted from $73 million in 2004 to $21 million in 2013 – signifying the lasting impact of the incident.

Incidents
On 30 August 2020 at about 4.45pm, a piece of ventilation duct was dislodged on a cinema hall in the nex outlet while screening Tenet, resulting in two injuries. A spokesperson informed that the outlet would be temporarily closed until further notice. The theatre later resumed operations on March 18, 2021.

See also
List of cinemas in Singapore
Cathay Cineplexes
Golden Village
WE Cinemas
Shaw Theatre

References

External links
 

Entertainment companies established in 1924
Cinema chains in Singapore
Shaw Brothers Studio
1924 establishments in Singapore
Singaporean brands